The Cut Bank Creek is a tributary of the Marias River in the Missouri river basin watershed, approximately 75 mi (123 km) long, in northwestern Montana in the United States, which having deeply eroded steep cliff banks eponymously gives name to the cut bank formal terrain term of geological science.

The river and cliff there are prototypical giving rise to the eponymous formally named "cut bank" geographic terrain feature archetype.
 
In southeastern Glacier County, approximately 12 mi (19 km) southeast of Cut Bank, it joins the Two Medicine River to form the Marias River.

See also

List of rivers of Montana
Montana Stream Access Law

Notes

Rivers of Montana
Landforms of Glacier National Park (U.S.)
Rivers of Glacier County, Montana